The 11th Inspection Commission of the Lao People's Revolutionary Party (LPRP) was elected at the 1st Plenary Session of the 11th LPRP Central Committee on 15 January 2021.

Members

References

2021 establishments in Laos
11th Inspection Commission of the Lao People's Revolutionary Party